USS Candid (AM-154) was an  built for the United States Navy during World War II and in commission from 1943 to 1945. In 1945, she was transferred to the Soviet Union and served after that in the Soviet Navy as T-283.

Construction and commissioning
Originally classified as a "coastal minesweeper," AMc-131, Candid was reclassified as a "minesweeper," AM-154, on 21 February 1942. She was launched on 14 October 1942 at Portland, Oregon, by Willamette Iron and Steel Works and commissioned on 31 October 1943.

Service history
Candid departed San Francisco, California, on 28 February 1944 for duty in the waters of the Territory of Alaska. Called upon to escort convoys and conduct patrols as well as to sweep for mines, she sailed through stormy waters to fog-bound ports in the  Aleutian Islands, supporting United States Army units on the isolated islands and backing up U.S. Navy attacks on the Kuril Islands of northern Japan. She returned to San Francisco on 18 August 1944, and two weeks later got underway for the Marshall Islands for operations there and in the Mariana Islands, providing local escort services in support of the consolidation of these islands and their development as bases for naval and air strikes against the Japanese.

On 16 April 1945, Candid got underway for Seattle, Washington and an overhaul. Selected for transfer to the Soviet Navy in Project Hula – a secret program for the transfer of U.S. Navy ships to the Soviet Navy at Cold Bay, Alaska, in anticipation of the Soviet Union joining the war against Japan – she departed Seattle in the summer of 1945 after the completion of her overhaul and proceeded to Cold Bay to begin familiarization training for her new Soviet crew.

Soviet Navy, 1945-1958

Following the completion of training for her Soviet crew, Candid was decommissioned on 17 August 1945 at Cold Bay and transferred to the Soviet Union under Lend-Lease immediately. She soon departed Cold Bay bound for Petropavlovsk-Kamchatsky in the Soviet Union, where she served in the Soviet Far East.

In February 1946, the United States began negotiations for the return of ships loaned to the Soviet Union for use during World War II, and on 8 May 1947, United States Secretary of the Navy James V. Forrestal informed the United States Department of State that the United States Department of the Navy wanted 480 of the 585 combatant ships it had transferred to the Soviet Union for World War II use returned. Deteriorating relations between the two countries as the Cold War broke out led to protracted negotiations over the ships, and by the mid-1950s the U.S. Navy found it too expensive to bring home ships that had become worthless to it anyway. Many ex-American ships were merely administratively "returned" to the United States and instead sold for scrap in the Soviet Union, while the U.S. Navy did not seriously pursue the return of others because it viewed them as no longer worth the cost of recovery. The Soviet Union never returned Candid to the United States, although the U.S. Navy reclassified her as a "fleet minesweeper" (MSF) and redesignated her MSF-154 on 7 February 1955.

Disposal
The Soviet Navy struck T-283 from its vessel register in 1958. Unaware of her fate, the U.S. Navy kept Candid on its Naval Vessel Register until finally striking her on 1 January 1983.

References 

 NavSource Online: Mine Warfare Vessel Photo Archive - Candid (MSF 154) - ex-AM-154 - ex-AMc-131

Admirable-class minesweepers
Ships built in Portland, Oregon
1942 ships
World War II minesweepers of the United States
Admirable-class minesweepers of the Soviet Navy
World War II minesweepers of the Soviet Union
Cold War minesweepers of the Soviet Union
Ships transferred under Project Hula